A Place for Paedophiles is a British documentary that was televised on 19 April 2009. Produced and presented by Louis Theroux, the documentary ran for 60 minutes, and took place at Coalinga State Hospital, a hospital for paedophiles.

Reception
The programme was widely praised for its approach to the subject of paedophilia. Leicester Mercury called the programme "a brilliantly-made, well-observed documentary. Fascinating, not sensationalist or sympathetic."

In 2010, Theroux received a Royal Television Society's award in the best presenter category for the documentary.

References

External links 

Louis Theroux's BBC Two specials
BBC television documentaries
2009 television specials
Documentary films about pedophilia
Films shot in California
Films set in psychiatric hospitals
Television episodes set in California
BBC travel television series